Waku Kungo Airport  is an airport serving Waku-Kungo in Cuanza Sul Province, Angola.

The Wako Kungu non-directional beacon (Ident: CE) is located on the field.

See also

 List of airports in Angola
 Transport in Angola

References

External links 
OpenStreetMap - Waku Kungo
Waco Kungu Airport

Airports in Angola